The Porto Tram Museum  is a museum operated by the Sociedade de Transportes Colectivos do Porto. It was inaugurated in 1992 and is installed in a former thermoelectric power station next to the River Douro in Massarelos, Porto, Portugal. It exhibits material related to the history of trams in Porto. The collection contains 16 electric cars, 5 trailers, and two maintenance vehicles as well as the former equipment of the power plant, which provided electricity for the tram lines.

The building 

The construction of the building as a power plant was completed in 1915. It consists of two large halls that were, respectively, the hall for the steam generators (boilers) and the engine room. Until the 1940s the power station produced enough energy to power the tram network. However, with the increase in the number of electric cars in circulation, the trams became partially dependent on the city's power supply and in the 1960s energy production at the plant ceased, although it continues to operate as a substation for the three remaining tram lines. The museum was opened on the site in May 1992. One hall of the building houses the trams and the other the electrical equipment. An additional shed houses the trams that are still used on a daily basis. The museum closed in December 2012, re-opening in November 2015 after repairs costing around one million Euros.

The collection 

The museum's collection consists of the following cars. A parade of many of the cars in the collection is held in Porto annually.

Trailer Car 1. This car was probably built by the company "A Constructora". It was acquired by the Companhia Carris de Ferro do Porto in the first decade of the 20th century.
Trailer Car 8. This is a horse-drawn tram purchased from Starbuck Car and Wagon Company of Birkenhead, England. This type of vehicle was first used in Porto on May 15, 1872. It has also been used as a trailer for steam and electric engines.

Trailer Car 18. This was built in the workshops of Companhia Carris de Ferro do Porto in 1934, and was used until the 1960s. Its windows were removed in the summer months, allowing smoking in the inside, which gave it the name of "smoker".
Trailer Car 25. This vehicle was designed and built as a trailer in the workshops of the Sociedade de Transportes Colectivos do Porto in the late 1940s. Later it also circulated as an electric car.
Electric Car 22. Built by the Starbuck Car and Wagon Company, this vehicle was initially a trailer car. With the development of electric traction in 1895, it was motorized and started to circulate as an electric car. It was restored in 1992 according to its original design.
Electric Car 100. This is a 1995 replica of a vehicle built in the first decade of the 20th century, which was destroyed in a large fire at Boavista station in Porto in February 1928. This, and car No. 104, can be hired for social events.
Electric Car 104. This vehicle is a replica with the same numbering and characteristics of an electric car that circulated initially as a trailer but, after 1895, was motorized. It was used until 1980. The construction of the replica was done in 1994.
Electric Car 163. This car features characteristics similar to those of the cars that were produced by the American J. G. Brill Company. However, its origin and date of manufacture are unknown.
Electric Car 247. This car was known by the name of "English car" because it was manufactured by the British United Electric Car Company of Preston. It was acquired by Companhia Carris de Ferro do Porto in 1909 and underwent several changes that removed some of its original characteristics.

Electric Car 250. This car belonged to a series of 12 vehicles built in the workshops of Companhia Carris de Ferro do Porto in 1927. Circulating until 1981 these vehicles were called "Italian cars" because they were equipped with engines of the Compagnia Generale di Elettricità in Italy.
Electric Car 267. This vehicle was built in the workshops of Companhia Carris de Ferro do Porto in 1930. Its windows were also removed during the summer months, allowing smoking inside.
Electric Car 269. This car was built in the workshops of Companhia Carris de Ferro do Porto in 1930 and circulated until the 1990s.
Electric Car 274. This car was built in the Workshops of Companhia Carris de Ferro do Porto in 1928. This vehicle is a copy of the first “Brill” car.
Electric Car 288. This vehicle belonged to a series of 10 electric cars that were acquired by Companhia Carris de Ferro do Porto from the Belgian company "Societé Anonyme des Ateliers de Construction d'Etablissements Famileureux" in 1928. Therefore, the cars of this series became known as the "Belgian cars ".
Electric Car No. 315. This car belonged to a series of 16 cars, numbered from 300 to 315, built in the workshops of Companhia Carris de Ferro do Porto between 1929 and 1930.
Electric Car 373. The electric cars of this series were designed and manufactured in the workshops of the Companhia Carris de Ferro do Porto between the years 1947 and 1949.
Electric Car 500. This car was designed and built in the workshops of the Sociedade de Transportes Colectivos do Porto  between the years of 1951 and 1952. This vehicle was the prototype of a series of cars that never were built. Its technical innovations included providing greater comfort to passengers and improved braking.
Hansa-Lloyd Tower Car (green). This car, for the repair of the overhead lines, was acquired in Germany in 1929 by Companhia Carris de Ferro do Porto. It allowed a greater flexibility in the repair of the cables, providing an alternative to the cars previously used for type of repair.
Hansa-Lloyd Tower Car (grey). This was also acquired in 1929.  

Car Tower Wagon 49. This electric repair car was built by Companhia Carris de Ferro do Porto in 1932. Equipped with a manual lift platform and a small workshop, it was intended to make minor repairs to the overhead lines and to electric cars while they were in service in the city.
Wagon 80. This type of wagon was used for the transportation of fish. It was used on a route between the fish market on the Atlantic at Matosinhos and the markets of Porto. It was towed by the trams that carried the fishmongers.
Dolly 58. Since the end of the 19th century, this type of dolly was used by the Companhia Carris de Ferro do Porto to transport coal from the mines of S. Pedro da Cova, on the outskirts of Porto, to the power plant at Massarelos.
Dolly 66. This electric car, with open platforms, mainly aimed at the transport of coal, goods and materials for road works, was built in the workshops of Companhia Carris de Ferro do Porto in 1915. Because of exposure to rain the brakeman had to wear a large cloak, wide-brimmed hat, rubber boots and insulated gloves to protect him from water and contact with electricity.
Wagon for Immediate Relief 76. This electric car is a replica of a vehicle built in the Workshops of Companhia Carris de Ferro do Porto. In its interior it has a repair workshop. If on-site repairs failed it was able to tow the electric cars back to the depot.
Railcar Wagon 48. This car was used to grind the track and make minor repairs on the road. Despite the various changes that it has undergone, it remains in line with the original, with two water tanks and a manually operated emery grinder.

References

External links

Public transport in Portugal
Tram transport in Portugal
Transport in Porto
Heritage streetcar systems
Museums in Porto